The 2006–07 Ohio State Buckeyes men's basketball team represented Ohio State University in the 2006–07 NCAA Division I men's basketball season. They were led by their third-year head coach, Thad Matta, and played their home game at the Value City Arena, in Columbus, Ohio as members of the Big Ten Conference. They finished the season 35–4, 15–1 in Big Ten play to win the regular season Big Ten championship. As the No. 1 seed in the Big Ten tournament, they defeated Michigan, Purdue, and Wisconsin to win the tournament championship. As a result, they earned the conference's automatic bid to the NCAA tournament and received a No. 1 seed in the South regional. They defeated Central Connecticut State and Matta's former team, Xavier, to advance to the Sweet Sixteen. The Buckeyes then defeated Tennessee and Memphis to advance to the Final Four, their first trip to the Final Four under Matta. With a win over Georgetown, they advanced to the National Championship game against Florida. Florida led from the start, beating the Buckeyes 84–75 to win the title. Of note, the Gators football team also defeated the Buckeyes to win the National Championship in the same year.

Preseason

Recruiting 

|-
!colspan=6| Junior College/Transfers

Roster

Schedule and results

|-
!colspan=9 style=| Exhibition

|-
!colspan=9 style=|Regular season

|-
!colspan=9 style=|Big Ten tournament

|- 
!colspan=9 style=|NCAA tournament

Rankings

*AP does not release post-NCAA tournament rankings.

References 

NCAA Division I men's basketball tournament Final Four seasons
Ohio State Buckeyes
Ohio State Buckeyes men's basketball seasons
Big Ten men's basketball tournament championship seasons
Ohio State
Ohio State Buckeyes
Ohio State Buckeyes